is a town located in Mie Prefecture, Japan. , the town had an estimated population of 41,542 in 16883 households and a population density of 390 persons per km².

Geography
Komono is located in the mountainous region of northern Mie Prefecture, bordering on Shiga Prefecture. Parts of the town are within the limits of the Suzuka Quasi-National Park.

Neighboring municipalities
Mie Prefecture
Yokkaichi
Inabe
Shiga Prefecture
Higashiōmi
Kōka

Climate
Komono has a Humid subtropical climate (Köppen Cfa) characterized by warm summers and cool winters with light to no snowfall.  The average annual temperature in Komono is 14.0 °C. The average annual rainfall is 1737 mm with September as the wettest month. The temperatures are highest on average in August, at around 25.6 °C, and lowest in January, at around 2.6 °C.

Demographics
Per Japanese census data, the population of Komono has increased steadily over the past 60 years.

History
Komoro is located in ancient Ise Province and was the center of 12,000 koku Komono Domain under the Tokugawa shogunate, ruled by the Hijikata clan from 1600 until the Meiji restoration of 1871. In the establishment of municipalities under the Meiji government’s reforms, it became Komoro village within Mie District of Mie Prefecture on April 1, 1889. Komoro was elevated to town status in 1928.

Government
Komono has a mayor-council form of government with a directly elected mayor and a unicameral city council of 18 members. Komono contributes two members to the Mie Prefectural Assembly. In terms of national politics, the town is part of Mie 3rd district of the lower house of the Diet of Japan.

Education
Komono has five public elementary schools and two public middle schools operated by the town government. The town has one public high school operated by the Mie Prefectural Board of Education..

Transportation

Railway
 Kintetsu Railway  Kintetsu Railway – Yunoyama Line
 -   -  -

Highway
 Shin-Meishin Expressway

Local attractions 
Gozaisho Ropeway
Yunoyama Onsen

Notable people
Tomoya Uchida, professional soccer player
Yuki Nishi, professional baseball player
Takuma Asano, professional soccer player

References

External links

Komono official website 

Towns in Mie Prefecture